Cordwell may refer to:

Cordwell, Derbyshire, a settlement in Derbyshire, England
Cordwell, Norfolk, a settlement in Norfolk, England
Cordwell (surname)
21425 Cordwell, an asteroid
Mount Cordwell, a mountain in Antarctica